Fighting Force is a 1997 3D beat 'em up developed by Core Design and published by Eidos. It was released for PlayStation, Microsoft Windows, and Nintendo 64 on October 31, 1997. Announced shortly after Core became a star developer through the critical and commercial success of Tomb Raider, Fighting Force was highly anticipated but met with mixed reviews.

Gameplay
Players control one of four characters as they move through urban and science fiction environments, battling waves of oncoming enemies with weapons including soda cans, knives, cars, and guns. The player can make some choices as to which territory to travel through.

Story
The four characters have various reasons for taking on Dr. Dex Zeng, a criminal mastermind with an army at his command who predicted that the world would end in the year 2000. After New Year's Eve 1999, Dr. Zeng believed that there was an error preventing the apocalypse, so decides to correct it by destroying the world himself. The action starts with a police cordon around Zeng's office skyscraper, moving to such locales as a shopping mall, subway and Coast Guard base before finally ending at the top of Zeng's island headquarters.

Characters

Players choose from a selection of four characters: Hawk Manson, Mace Daniels, Alana McKendricks and Ben "Smasher" Jackson. Hawk Manson and Mace Daniels are two all-around characters. Hawk is somewhat stronger than Mace who is in turn faster than Hawk. Ben "Smasher" Jackson is a large and slow bruiser capable of lifting and throwing the engines of cars at enemies. Alana McKendricks is a fast but soft-hitting teenager with an effective jump-kick. All four characters have a special move that can be performed with the loss of a portion of health.

Development and release
Core Design originally pitched the game to Sega as a potential fourth entry in Sega's Streets of Rage series. Sega declined; according to Core, Sega explained that it had its own plans for continuing the series. Core opted to go ahead with the game as a standalone, multi-platform title, and started work on it. Core Design collaborated with ten coders from EA Japan in making the game.

The story line and character designs were done by Marc Silvestri. The character of Dr. Zeng was inspired by Heaven's Gate.

A "Battle Arena" mode was added to the game during development, but it was cut from the final version.

In addition to the PlayStation, Windows, and Nintendo 64 versions, a Sega Saturn version was developed and eventually completed. After Eidos decided against publishing this version, Sega Europe secured the publishing rights and announced a European release date of November 1997, but it was ultimately cancelled. An early prototype, with older character designs, was leaked in November 2008.

Eidos demonstrated a playable Nintendo 64 version at the 1998 E3. Eidos later cancelled this version of the game, but in February 1999 publisher Crave Entertainment purchased the rights from Eidos and put the game into its release schedule. The Nintendo 64 version was released in North America and Europe in 1999, under the title Fighting Force 64. Differences include partially improved graphics and changes in the available number of player lives.

Reception 

The original PlayStation release received mostly mixed reviews. Critics overwhelmingly commented that the game has a satisfyingly large amount of interactive scenery to destroy or collect weapons from, but agreed that despite the transition to 3D, the gameplay was not meaningfully different from the 2D beat 'em ups of earlier console generations. GameSpot summed it up as "basically a 3D version of Capcom's classic, Final Fight, except the characters and enemies lack the personality that made Final Fight exciting." Some, however, looked on the game's lack of innovation as a virtue rather than a liability; Shawn Smith commented in Electronic Gaming Monthly, "What's cool about Fighting Force is that it plays like the old side-scrolling games of the same nature. Then you might ask, why not just make a 2-D one. Well, when the 3-D works, why not go with it?" Next Generation took more of a middle ground, stating that "despite its derivative nature, Fighting Force is a very fun game. Yet, it's just not the same huge leap forward for the Final Fight genre that we might have expected from the creators of Tomb Raider."

Besides lack of originality, some critics criticized it for repetitiveness and took issue with how the control configuration assigns multiple actions to the same button while leaving other buttons on the controller unused, saying this often results in the character performing a different action than intended and leaving them open to enemy attacks. GamePro nonetheless opined, "Despite its few flaws, Fighting Force delivers the fierce fun and beat-fools-silly action that PlayStation gamers are looking for." IGN, while contradicting GamePro by actually praising the game's controls, offered a somewhat more pessimistic overall take: "With solid graphics, impeccable control, yet almost zero innovation or variety, Fighting Force is a mixed bag. If in doubt, rent before you buy." AllGame gave the game three stars out of five, saying, "All in all, Fighting Force isn't a bad game. Just some problems that lie in the gameplay department and some graphical glitches that keep this title from achieving the status of the games it was modeled after." In Japan, where the game was ported and published by Electronic Arts Victor under the name  on 15 January 1998, Famitsu gave it a score of 25 out of 40.

PC Zone gave the PC version 88%, calling it "a computer game in which a lot of people get hurt in a variety of entertaining ways, with excellent 3D visuals and a surprising amount of detail." However, PC Gamer UK gave it 62%, calling it "A middle class game without fire in its belly that refuses to strive for better things."

GamePro and Nintendo Power gave the Nintendo 64 average reviews while the game was still in development under Eidos, months before the company handed its development rights over to Crave.

The game was a commercial success, selling  units worldwide and satisfying a demand for a Streets of Rage like 3D beat 'em up experience in the industry at the time. In the United States, the game sold 596,404 units.

Sequels
A sequel, Fighting Force 2, was released on December 13, 1999 for the PlayStation and Dreamcast. Unlike the first title, Fighting Force 2 focuses on the character of Hawk Manson exclusively, and rewards a more stealthy approach.

A second sequel, Fighting Force 3 was also in development for the Xbox and PlayStation 2, but was cancelled during development.

Notes

References

External links
 

1997 video games
Beat 'em ups
Cancelled Sega Saturn games
Cooperative video games
Core Design games
Crave Entertainment games
Eidos Interactive games
Fiction featuring the turn of the third millennium
Nintendo 64 games
Organized crime video games
PlayStation (console) games
PlayStation Network games
Square Enix franchises
Video games about cults
Video games featuring female protagonists
Windows games
3D beat 'em ups
Video games set in New York City
Video games developed in the United Kingdom